Ali Boulala (born January 28, 1979) is a Swedish professional skateboarder, who has appeared in the Flip Skateboards videos Sorry and Really Sorry, Osiris' Subject to Change, and numerous Baker Skateboards videos.

Early life
Boulala was born in Stockholm, Sweden, and is of Finnish and Algerian descent.

Professional skateboarding
Boulala is sponsored by Flip Skateboards, Independent trucks and Flip wheels. In 2010, Boulala was invited to rejoin the Kr3w Clothing Team, but is no longer listed as a team member on the brand's website as of 2014.

Boulala's skateboarding concentrated on the unusual, as he preferred to skate in obscure locations and experiment with skateboard tricks. He is also well known for his attempt to ollie the Lyon 25, a twenty-five-stair stairwell in Lyon, France, as shown in the Flip 2002 video release Sorry. He is also famous for having a part in all of the Baker Skateboard Videos.

Boulala appeared on the front cover of Transworld Skateboarding magazine and about 100,000 units of his signature skateboard decks have been sold since he became a professional skateboarder in 1997.

Personal life

Boulala was banned from entering the United States because of his public drunken shenanigans. It's not clear how long or if he is allowed back in the United States. He is also member of a friendship group called the "Piss Drunx" (PD), together with Aaron Pearcy, Jim Greco, Andrew Reynolds, Erik Ellington, and Dustin Dollin. Dollin explained in a 2011 interview that the brand "Shake Junt" is the "new Piss Drunx."

Death of Shane Cross
On 7 March 2007, Shane Cross died in a motorcycle crash in Melbourne, Australia — he was a passenger on a motorcycle driven by Boulala, who was seriously injured in the crash. Prior to the crash, both riders were affected by alcohol, and neither wore helmets as a safety precaution before embarking on the ride. The DailyTelegraph, published in Sydney, Australia, disclosed in a post-accident article:

Boulala had a blood alcohol concentration of .162 and Cross, who died in hospital, had a blood alcohol level of .18.

Boulala and Cross had earlier been at a city nightspot, the Cherry Bar. Then, they went to a friend's house to drink beer. County Court Judge Sue Pullen said Boulala slammed into the hotel wall at an estimated 30 km/h about 1:05am after doing two to three laps around the block.
Following a four-month coma, Boulala was subsequently charged, found guilty of culpable driving and sentenced to a four-year prison sentence. Huck magazine published an interview that one of its journalists had conducted with Boulala following his release. In the several months following Cross' death, senior Flip team rider Arto Saari quit the Flip company, despite having been with the company for the entirety of his professional career, due to the distress that was caused by Cross' death.

Video game appearances
Boulala is a playable character in the Electronic Arts video game: Skate.

References

1979 births
Living people
Swedish skateboarders
Swedish people of Algerian descent
Swedish sportspeople of African descent
Swedish people of Finnish descent